Undressed is a lost 1928 silent film drama directed by Phil Rosen and starring David Torrence, Hedda Hopper and Virginia Brown Faire. It was produced and released by independent Sterling Pictures.

Cast
David Torrence - Martin Stanley
Hedda Hopper - Mrs. Stanley
Virginia Brown Faire - Diana Stanley
Buddy Messinger - Bobby Arnold
Bryant Washburn - Paul Howard
Virginia Vance - Marjorie Stanley

References

External links
 Undressed at IMDb.com

1928 films
American silent feature films
Lost American films
Films directed by Phil Rosen
American black-and-white films
1928 drama films
Silent American drama films
1928 lost films
Lost drama films
1920s American films